Anarchist Voices: An Oral History of Anarchism in America is a 1995 oral history book of 53 interviews with anarchists over 30 years by Paul Avrich.

References

External links 

 
 

1996 non-fiction books
American history books
Books by Paul Avrich
History books about anarchism
History books about the United States
Oral history books
Princeton University Press books